Studies in People’s History is a peer reviewed journal.  It is a forum that embraces all aspects of History under the broadest of definitions, but always bearing in mind their relationship with society at large.

It is published twice a year by SAGE Publications in association with Aligarh Historians Society.

This journal is a member of the Committee on Publication Ethics (COPE).

Abstracting and indexing 
 Studies in People’s History is abstracted and indexed in:
 J-Gate
 SCOPUS
 UGC-CARE

External links
 
 Homepage

References
 http://publicationethics.org/members

SAGE Publishing academic journals
Biannual journals
History journals
Publications established in 2014